Batrachorhina vulpina is a species of beetle in the family Cerambycidae. It was described by Johann Christoph Friedrich Klug in 1833, originally under the genus Saperda. It is known from Réunion and Mauritius.

Subspecies
 Batrachorhina vulpina denticollis (Fairmaire, 1898)
 Batrachorhina vulpina vulpina (Klug, 1833)

References

Batrachorhina
Beetles described in 1833